Katov may refer to:

 Kátov, village in Skalica District, Slovakia
 Katov (Brno-Country District), village in Brno-Country District, Czech Republic
 Katov (Tábor District), village in Tábor District, Czech Republic